How to Kill a Judge, also known as The Murder of a Magistrate and Why Does One Kill a Magistrate?, is a 1974 Italian crime-thriller film directed by Damiano Damiani. It is the final chapter in the Damiani's trilogy about mafia, after The Day of the Owl and Confessions of a Police Captain. 

It was released on DVD by Blue Underground in March 2006.

Plot   
Giacomo Solaris is a film-maker whose latest released feature film is a crime thriller about a judge who gets too friendly with the Mafia and is murdered. A resentful Sicilian magistrate orders the film seized, but then the judge winds up dead, in a fashion just like that in Solaris's movie. Solaris realizes that corrupt political forces are pulling strings and attempting to cover up murders of his friends who begin to die in grisly ways. Will he learn the truth about the murder of the judge in time?

Cast 
The film was dubbed into English with voice actors based within Italy, with Franco being the sole actor to reprise his role and dub himself over in English.

Additional English Dub Voices 
Cicely Browne
Lewis E. Ciannelli
Mickey Knox
Gene Luotto
Robert Spafford

See also     
 List of Italian films of 1974

References

External links

1974 films
Films directed by Damiano Damiani
1970s crime thriller films
1970s political thriller films
Films about the Sicilian Mafia
Poliziotteschi films
Films about film directors and producers
Films about journalists
Films scored by Riz Ortolani
1970s legal films
Italian political thriller films
1970s Italian films